Ntokozo Khonziwe Fortunate Hlonyana is a South African politician serving as a Member of the National Assembly of South Africa since 23 January 2018. She is a member of the Economic Freedom Fighters party.

Biography
Hlonyana has a national diploma in sports management from the Durban University of Technology and a governance certificate from the University of Pretoria. She joined the EFF in 2013. She was a member of a branch command team and served as a coordinator of a sub-region. Hlonyana was also an organiser of the party's provincial command team in Gauteng. In 2018, she was convener of the EFF's Chris Hani Region. Prior to that, she was the Alfred Nzo regional coordinator. In 2019, she was elected to the EFF's central command team as an additional member.

During her first term as an MP, she served on both the higher education and training and economic development portfolio committees. She was elected to a full term in the 2019 general election. She is currently a member of the Portfolio Committee on Women, Youth and People with Disabilities.

References

External links
Mrs Khonziwe Ntokozo Fortunate Hlonyana at Parliament of South Africa

Living people
Year of birth missing (living people)
People from Gauteng
Economic Freedom Fighters politicians
Members of the National Assembly of South Africa
Women members of the National Assembly of South Africa
21st-century South African politicians
21st-century South African women politicians